The Canton of Elne is a former French canton of Pyrénées-Orientales department, in Languedoc-Roussillon. It had 22,823 inhabitants (2012). It was disbanded in 2015.

Composition 
The canton of Elne comprised 7 communes:
Elne
Bages
Corneilla-del-Vercol
Montescot
Ortaffa
Théza
Villeneuve-de-la-Raho

References

Elne